Pseudoalteromonas donghaensis is a marine bacterium which was originally isolated from seawater near South Korea.

References

External links
 

Alteromonadales